The Pilgrims are a rock band from Windsor, Vermont. Seven Days contributor Dan Bolles compared their style to alt-punk and indie rock, while John Powell, writing for Angelica Music, has likened them to rock and roll bands from the 1960s and 1970s. They are part of the Windsor, VT music collective What Doth Life, which has released albums by The Pilgrims, Giant Travel Avant Garde, Derek and The Demons, Carton, and Luke Chrisinger.

Members 
Current
Brendan Dangelo - bass (2010 – present)
Davis McGraw - keyboard, guitar, mandolin, lead and backing vocals (2010 – 2013, 2017 – present)
Chris Egner - drums, percussion (2011 – present)
Kiel Alarcon - guitar (2015 – present)
Chris Rosenquest - lead vocals (2015– present)

Former
Chris Goulet – guitar, lead and backing vocals  (2010 – 2019) 
John Demasi – drums (2010 – 2011)

Discography 

 Nantucket (single)(2020)
 Mimosa Man (2019)
 No Focus (2017)
 Shred Savage (2015) Home & Home Vol 2 Split (2014)
 BU$$ (2013)
 It's Not Pretty (2012) Natalie Goes To College (2012) Nobility (2011)''

References

External links 
 http://www.pilgrimsvt.com/
 http://www.whatdothlife.com/bands/pilgrims/
 http://pilgrimsvt.bandcamp.com/
 http://www.whatdothlife.com/blog

Alternative rock groups from Vermont
Musical groups established in 2010
2010 establishments in Vermont